The American Music Award for Favorite Artist – Contemporary Inspirational has been awarded since 2002. Years reflect the year in which the awards were presented, for works released in the previous year (until 2003 onward when awards were handed out on November of the same year). The all-time winners in this category are Casting Crowns and Lauren Daigle with four wins each. Casting Crowns is the most nominated act with eight nominations.

Winners and nominees

2000s

2010s

2020s

Category facts

Multiple wins
Four wins
 Casting Crowns
 Lauren Daigle (Consecutive)

Two wins
 Mary Mary
 MercyMe

Multiple nominations
Eight nominations
 Casting Crowns

Six nominations
 MercyMe
 Lauren Daigle

Five nominations
 tobyMac

Four nominations
 Third Day

Three nominations
 Jeremy Camp
 Steven Curtis Chapman
 Hillsong United
 Chris Tomlin

Two nominations
 Jars of Clay
 Mary Mary
 Newsboys

See also

 List of religion-related awards

References

American Music Awards
Christian music awards
Awards established in 2002